The 1946–47 Romanian Hockey League season was the 18th season of the Romanian Hockey League. Four teams participated in the league, and HC Ciocanul Bucuresti won the championship.

Regular season

Dermagand Târgu Mureș - CS Miercurea Ciuc 13-1

HC Ciocanul București - Textila  Buhuși 6-0 

Dermagand Târgu Mureș - Textila  Buhuși 10-2

HC Ciocanul București - CS Miercurea Ciuc 7-2

CS Miercurea Ciuc - Textila  Buhuși 11-5

HC Ciocanul București - Dermagand Târgu Mureș 1-1 (Sadovsky - Turcu)

HC Ciocanul: Dron, Anastasiu, Sadovsky, Flamaropol, Fl. Popescu, Dlugosch, Tanase, Pana, Amirovici

External links
hochei.net

Romania
Romanian Hockey League seasons
1946–47 in Romanian ice hockey